Oodnadatta Airport  is an aerodrome that services Oodnadatta, South Australia, Australia.

History
It was utilised by the Royal Australian Air Force's No. 34 Squadron to courier equipment and stores, transport troops and utilised by RAAF and United States Army Air Force fighter and bomber aircraft en route to Darwin, Northern Territory.

The airport holds the record for the hottest temperature recorded in Australia.

See also
 List of airports in South Australia
Oodnadatta#Climate - climate data

References

Airports in South Australia
Far North (South Australia)